Jennifer Barbara Donnet (born 26 May 1963) is a retired Australian competitive diver.

She was the first woman in any sport to represent Australia at four Olympic Games, competing in 1980 (Moscow), 1984 (Los Angeles), 1988 (Seoul) and 1992 (Barcelona).  She was the Olympic Team Captain and Australian flag bearer at the Opening Ceremony of the 1992 Summer Olympics in Barcelona.

Donnet won gold medals in the 3m springboard event at the 1982 and 1990 Commonwealth Games, and silver in the event at the 1986 Games. She is a member of the Australian Diving Hall of Fame.

Her father, Tom Donnet, was an Olympic Diving Coach and her mother, Barbara McAulay, was also a diver who won gold and silver medals in the 1954 Empire and Commonwealth Games (Vancouver), and competed at the 1956 Melbourne Olympics.

References

1963 births
Living people
Australian female divers
Commonwealth Games gold medallists for Australia
Commonwealth Games silver medallists for Australia
Divers at the 1980 Summer Olympics
Divers at the 1984 Summer Olympics
Divers at the 1988 Summer Olympics
Divers at the 1992 Summer Olympics
Olympic divers of Australia
Divers at the 1982 Commonwealth Games
Divers at the 1986 Commonwealth Games
Divers at the 1990 Commonwealth Games
Recipients of the Australian Sports Medal
Commonwealth Games medallists in diving
People educated at Blackburn High School
20th-century Australian women
21st-century Australian women
Divers from Melbourne
Sportswomen from Victoria (Australia)
Medallists at the 1982 Commonwealth Games
Medallists at the 1986 Commonwealth Games
Medallists at the 1990 Commonwealth Games